Joseph Moody may refer to:
 Joseph D. Moody (1841–1909), American dentist and president of the Historical Society of Southern California
 Joe Moody (politician) (born 1981), member of the Texas House of Representatives
 Joe Moody (rugby union) (born 1988), New Zealand rugby union player